The Next Band were a British rock trio featuring vocalist/bassist Rocky Newton, guitarist John Lockton and drummer Frank Noon, who is credited with playing drums on Def Leppard's 1979 EP The Def Leppard E.P..  The band's name was later changed to Red Alert.

Other bands featuring members of The Next Band
Lockton and Noon were later in Wild Horses with Rainbow and Dio bassist Jimmy Bain.

Newton and Noon were later in Lionheart with former Iron Maiden guitarist Dennis Stratton.

Lockton was later in the band Victory, with whom he played on their self-titled album.  Newton is credited as a guest backing vocalist on the Victory album Culture Killed The Native, though by that time John Lockton was no longer in the band.

Newton was later a member of the McAuley Schenker Group, playing on the band's first two albums and co-writing the group's first big hit, "Gimme Your Love."

Frank Noon was later in the band Roadhouse with his former Def Leppard bandmate Pete Willis.

Four by Three EP
The Next Band released the Four by Three EP (four songs by three people) in September 1978. It was recorded at Fairview Studios in Kingston upon Hull. This EP would be one of the inspirations behind Def Leppard's own The Def Leppard E.P.

Track listing of Four by Three EP
 "Never on a Win"
 "Close Encounters"
 "Red Alert"
 "Too Many Losers"

Line up
Rocky Newton - lead vocals, bass
John Lockton - guitar
Frank Noon - drums

References

External links
Tartareandesire.com
Nwobhm.com

British rock music groups
British musical trios